The Coburg Football Club, nicknamed the Coburg Lions, is an Australian rules football club based in Coburg, a northern suburb of Melbourne, and currently playing in the Victorian Football League (VFL). It is based at Coburg City Oval since 1915, which was partly redeveloped in 2020. Coburg has historically been a proud club and has won 6 VFA/VFL premierships with the most recent premiership in 1989. From 2001 to 2013 the club was aligned with the Richmond Football Club in the Australian Football League (AFL), acting as its reserves team. As of 2014, Coburg is a stand-alone club in the Victorian Football League (VFL).

History

Early history
After competing in junior competitions, Coburg was always keen to be promoted up the ranks.

Coburg was immediately successful in the VFA, playing finals in its first season and winning three consecutive premierships from 1926 until 1928; however, these were the club's last top-division premiership for more than fifty years. Coburg was runners-up to the Northcote Football Club in three successive seasons from 1932 to 1934, and was also runners-up in 1941. The club was dominant in the junior/seconds competition from its inception in 1928 up to World War II, winning nine seconds premierships in thirteen seasons, including four in a row from 1937 until 1940.

Coburg has the second highest number of reported players in a VFA match, which occurred in the 1933 Grand final against Northcote Football Club.

The Lions gained prolific goal kickers Lance Collins and Bob Pratt during the 1930s and 1940s. Collins, in his first full season in 1936 (he was injured in 1935 and played one game), kicked 16, 12, 11 and 10 goals in separate games to kick 116 goals for the season; in 98 games for Coburg Football Club (VFA) his tally was 432 goals. Bob Pratt, who crossed from the VFL without a clearance early in the throw-pass era, kicked 183 goals in the 1941 VFA season for Coburg, which was then the highest number of goals kicked in a VFA season until Ron Todd of Williamstown (VFA) beat that record and kicked 188 goals in 1945. Pratt and Collins together hold the record for the most goals by two players in a season: they kicked a total of 256 goals in 1941. Pratt kicked 22 goals in a match against Sandringham Football Club: a club record.

1965–1970: Financial struggle
The club's existence was threatened in 1965, when the City of Coburg leased Coburg Oval to the VFL's North Melbourne Football Club, leaving the club without a home ground. After going into debt attempting to fight the council's move, the club came to an arrangement to merge with North Melbourne, and fourteen committeemen left the club and moved to North Melbourne as part of the merge; but, dissenting committeemen and life members opposed to the merger formed a rival committee, and with the support of the VFA executive, were able to continue operating Coburg as a stand-alone club in 1965, playing games in Port Melbourne. The club's future was still in doubt until it could find a new permanent home ground; but North Melbourne's move to Coburg Oval, which was intended to be long-term, ended up lasting only one season, allowing Coburg to return to Coburg Oval and continue operating there from 1966 onwards.

The only J.J. Liston trophy winner for Coburg was Jim Sullivan in 1967. Prior to 1943 the Best and Fairest Award in the VFA was the 'Recorder Cup'. Coburg VFA winners were Peter Reville (ex-South Melbourne VFL) who was the equal winner in 1936 and E. "Snowy" Martin in 1927.

Jim Sullivan was credited by club statistics to have amassed 54 kicks in a match in 1969, which is the second highest recorded in senior football competition and the highest in the VFA competition.

1978–1990: Premierships and revival
After many years in the doldrums, the club enjoyed somewhat of a rebirth in the late 1970s, with a continued period of success until the 1990. During that time, the club won three flags (1979, 1988 and 1989), finished runner-up another two times (1980 and 1986) and won four minor premierships (1980, 1986, 1988 and 1989). Even so, the club's off-field position was not secure during this time, and the club was at risk of folding in 1982–83. VFA legend Phil Cleary was a member of all these games, as either a player or a coach.

1990–1998: Lean years
After the success of the 1970s and 80s, the 1990s proved to be lean years for Coburg.

After the departure of club legend Phil Cleary as coach in 1992, the club hired the services of Alex Jeaseaulenko, who coached the club to a winless season in 1993.

Coburg would subsequently go onto finish last in both the 1997 and 1998 seasons.

1999–2000: Coburg-Fitzroy Lions
For the 1999 and 2000 seasons, Coburg entered into a partnership with the Fitzroy Football Club.

Fitzroy, which had played in the VFA between 1884 and 1896, then in the VFL/AFL from 1897 until 1996, no longer operated a football team following the creation of the Brisbane Lions in late 1996, but it still had an administrative presence. Under what was effectively a sponsorship arrangement, Coburg became known as the Coburg-Fitzroy Lions, taking its new name at the beginning of August 1999. The club retained navy blue and red as its main colours, but adopted Fitzroy's red, royal blue and gold colours as an alternative strip

Despite large crowds of both Lions fans attending the home games, financial problems and AFL pressure, meant that Coburg were forced to align with an AFL reserves side, and the partnership with Fitzroy was severed at the end of the 2000 season.

2001–2013: Richmond alignment

From 2001 until 2013, Coburg had an alignment in place with the AFL's Richmond Football Club, which saw Richmond's players eligible to play senior football for Coburg when not selected in the AFL. During this time, the club changed its nickname from the Lions to the Tigers. Its best performance during that time was during 2007, when the seniors finished as runners-up and the reserves side won the premiership.

2014–present: Return of the Lions
The affiliation with the Richmond Football Club ended after the 2013 season; Coburg returned to operations as a stand-alone senior club in the VFL from 2014, and returned to the nickname "Lions". The club is yet to achieve any success since its return to stand-alone operation, and as of 2020 has not finished outside the bottom four during this period. During this time, the club was coached by Peter German (2014–2017), Leigh Adams (2018–2019) and Andrew Sturgess (2020-2022).

On 14 November 2022, former Collingwood Development Coach Jamie Cassidy-McNamara was appointed as the Lions new Senior Coach on a two-year deal commencing in 2023, following the shock departure of Sturgess.

Club symbols

Coburg competed as the Lions from 1925 until 2001. The logo was presented in a shield format and was used until the Richmond alignment in 2001. Under its alignment with Richmond, the club changed its logo and its nickname to the Tigers. The design of the Tiger is based around Richmond's logo, which was identical at the time. The colour scheme was changed to match that of Coburg's so the club could still have some of its identity. This was the logo until the severing of the link in 2013. The club went back to its roots in 2014, and became the Lions again. The Lion was back on the emblem.  However, the scroll remained from the Lions' tenure with the Tigers.

Rivalries
The club has strong rivalries with Port Melbourne, Williamstown and Preston. The rivalry with Port Melbourne stems from both clubs particularly spiteful encounters throughout the 1980 VFA season culminating in the 1980 grand final which Port won by 11 points. This was added to further in 2018 when Lions captain Tom Goodwin walked out of the club to play for Port Melbourne and later in 2021 when its star midfielder Marcus Lentini also joined the Borough. The rivalry with Williamstown originated in the 1980s. After the Seagulls narrowly beat Coburg to claim the 1986 VFA premiership, the Lions would go back to back in 1988 and 1989 beating Williamstown on both occasions. Coburg and the Preston/Northern Bullants share a strong local rivalry and compete in the Battle of Bell Street.

Home ground
Coburg City Oval has the home ground of the Coburg Football Club throughout its history, except in 1965, when it served as the home of the North Melbourne Football Club in the VFL season; during that season, Coburg played its home matches at North Port Oval in Port Melbourne. The ground has a grandstand on the southern end near the goals. Terraces surround the rest of the ground. The capacity of the ground is 15,000, and the highest attendance recorded was 21,695. There are seats for approximately 3,000–5,000 people. From 2011, Coburg City Oval was known as Mantello Holden Oval. In 2014, club General Manager Craig Lees signed a three-year naming rights deal with Piranha Foods , with the ground to be known as Piranha Park until 2016. The Naming Rights deal was extended for another three seasons in September, 2016.

From early 2020 to May 2021 the ground underwent a much needed redevelopment, with works done on the grandstand, club offices, club facilities, and ground drainage.

Community
Coburg is seen as a leader in the football world for its work in the local Moreland community, and The Lions are the only stand alone side in the VFL to make no income from gaming and pokies revenue.

They have close ties with indigenous community through their NAIDOC week game, and also hold the annual Vicky Cleary game, which is a domestic violence awareness raiser dedicated to the late sister of club legend Phil Cleary, who was tragically killed by an ex-partner in 1987.

Club song 
The club song is to the tune of "California Here I Come".

We're the Coburg pride you know
All our coaches tell us so
We're faster
We're stronger
We'll dominate you
We're triers
We're flyers
We're the team of Red and Blue
And when we reach that final four
Then we'll kick those goals galore
Then you'll hear those Lions roar
Oh yes Coburg will be there

Current playing list

Club records

Club

Individual
Games records

Dave Starbuck holds the club record for games, with 219, played mostly in the 1950s. He is closely followed by cult figure, Vin "The Tank" Taranto, who played during the 1980s and the dark days of the 1990s, when the club was at its lowest and almost folded. Third on the games list, on 205 games, is Cleary.

Team of the Century

Notes

References

External links

 
 Full Points Footy Profile for Coburg

 
Victorian Football League clubs
Australian rules football clubs in Melbourne
1891 establishments in Australia
Australian rules football clubs established in 1891
Sport in the City of Merri-bek